The canton of Loches is an administrative division of the Indre-et-Loire department, central France. Its borders were modified at the French canton reorganisation which came into effect in March 2015. Its seat is in Loches.

It consists of the following communes:
 
Azay-sur-Indre
Beaulieu-lès-Loches
Beaumont-Village
Bridoré
Chambourg-sur-Indre
Chanceaux-près-Loches
Chédigny
Chemillé-sur-Indrois
Dolus-le-Sec
Ferrière-sur-Beaulieu
Genillé
Le Liège
Loché-sur-Indrois
Loches
Montrésor
Nouans-les-Fontaines
Orbigny
Perrusson
Reignac-sur-Indre
Saint-Hippolyte
Saint-Jean-Saint-Germain
Saint-Quentin-sur-Indrois
Saint-Senoch
Sennevières
Tauxigny-Saint-Bauld
Verneuil-sur-Indre
Villedômain
Villeloin-Coulangé

References

Cantons of Indre-et-Loire